Carlos Argelis Gómez Peña, nicknamed Go-Go, (born December 4, 1985) is a Dominican former professional baseball outfielder. He played for the New York Mets, Minnesota Twins, Milwaukee Brewers, Houston Astros, Texas Rangers and Tampa Bay Rays. Gómez is a two-time MLB All-Star and a Gold Glove Award winner.

Professional career

Minor leagues
At just 16 years of age, Gómez signed with the New York Mets as an international free agent on July 27, 2002. Along with Fernando Martínez, Gómez was considered one of their top outfield prospects, and was considered to be a five-tool prospect. While they were teammates, Mets shortstop José Reyes, who led the National League in stolen bases and triples for multiple seasons, said that Gómez was faster than he was. In fact, while he and Gómez were teammates with the Mets, Gómez routinely beat him in foot races during spring training.

In 2006, Gómez played for the Double-A Binghamton Mets of the Eastern League and was the co-winner of the Sterling Award. He finished second in the league with 41 stolen bases and fifth in the league with eight triples. He batted .281 (121–430) with 53 runs scored, 24 doubles, seven home runs and 48 runs batted in.

Gómez started the 2007 season with the Triple-A New Orleans Zephyrs. Playing every day, by the second week of May he led the Pacific Coast League (PCL) with 17 stolen bases in 36 games and hit .286 (40-for-140), scoring 24 runs, and hitting eight doubles, two triples, and two home runs.

New York Mets
Gómez made his major league debut with the Mets on May 13, 2007. At 21 years and 205 days old, he became the youngest player in the National League. In his first season, Gómez hit .232 with 2 home runs and 12 RBIs in 139 at bats.

Minnesota Twins
When pitcher Johan Santana of the Minnesota Twins became available via trade, the Mets traded Gómez and pitchers Deolis Guerra, Philip Humber and Kevin Mulvey to the Twins to acquire him on January 29, 2008. Gómez became the starting center fielder for the Twins, following Torii Hunter's signing with the Los Angeles Angels. He won a three-way race for center field in 2008, beating out prospects Denard Span and Jason Pridie.  Gómez's 40-yard dash time was clocked at 4.29. Twins manager Ron Gardenhire nicknamed Gómez "Go-Go" due to his last name and his blazing speed. Batting first, with Alexi Casilla batting second, Gardenhire referred to the speedy duo as "Loose Cannon One" and "Loose Cannon Two."

Gómez had an excellent regular-season debut for the Twins, going 2-for-3 with a walk, two stolen bases and two runs as the Twins beat the Angels, 3–2. On April 11, 2008, Gómez hit his first career triple off Yasuhiko Yabuta of the Royals.

On May 7, 2008, Gómez hit for the cycle against the Chicago White Sox at U.S. Cellular Field in Chicago. He became the ninth major leaguer in history to hit for the reverse natural cycle. He also became the third-youngest player to hit for the cycle in MLB history.

In 2008, he led the major leagues with 30 bunt hits, but was also picked off a major-league-leading 10 times.  Defensively, he led all major league center fielders in errors, with 8.

Milwaukee Brewers
On November 6, 2009, Gómez was traded to the Milwaukee Brewers in exchange for J. J. Hardy and $250,000.

In 2011, Gómez led all NL outfielders in range factor, at 2.97, and tied for the NL lead in fielding percentage for outfielders, at 1.000. On July 20, 2011, Gómez fractured his collarbone when he made a diving catch in shallow center field. He returned for the rest of the season in September. During the 2011 postseason, Gómez hit .357, with 1 home run and 2 RBIs.

In 2012, Gómez started the season platooning with Nyjer Morgan and Norichika Aoki in center field, but eventually Gómez got more starting playing time. Gómez ended up having the best season of his major league career at that point. Gómez had career highs with a .260 batting average, .305 on-base percentage, 19 home runs, and 37 stolen bases in the 2012 season.

Prior to the 2013 season, Gómez signed a 3-year, $24 million extension with the Brewers.

Gómez started the 2013 season as the Brewers' starting center fielder, though he struggled early, batting only .162 after the first couple of weeks. After that, Gómez went on a tear, getting 3 hits in each of the next three games, raising his average back up to .300 just a week later. Gómez was named National League Player of the Week for his efforts, the third time he had won the award. Gómez was named to his first All-Star team.  Mariano Rivera retired him to end the 8th inning in his last all-star game.

On September 26, Gómez was suspended for one game for his role in an on-field altercation during a game on September 25 against the Atlanta Braves. In the game, Gómez hit a home run, and as he trotted around the bases, shouted at Braves pitcher Paul Maholm for apparently throwing at Gómez in an earlier game. As Gómez reached home plate, Braves catcher Brian McCann deliberately stood between Gómez and home plate, blocking him, which sparked a brief brawl between the two teams.

Gómez's 2013 season was the best of his major league career, attaining career highs in practically every offensive category: a .284 batting average, .338 on-base percentage, 27 doubles, 10 triples, 24 home runs, 80 runs scored, 73 RBIs, and 40 stolen bases. He led the National League in power-speed number (30.0). Gómez had a spectacular season defensively as well, leading the league in defensive putouts, as well as taking away five potential home runs. Gómez finished 3rd in the National League in Wins Above Replacement (WAR). he won the NL Gold Glove Award for center field, becoming the first Brewer to win the award since Robin Yount in 1982.

Gómez began 2014 as Milwaukee's starting center fielder and leadoff hitter. In May, Gómez got into an altercation in a game against the Pittsburgh Pirates. In the game, Gómez hit a deep fly ball that he initially thought was a home run. As a result, he flipped his bat out of his hand, something he was known to do when hitting a home run. The ball ended up hitting the outfield wall, though Gómez still ended up at third base with a triple. When Pirates pitcher Gerrit Cole confronted Gómez about showing off, the two began to argue, and as the two were separated, Pirates player Travis Snider confronted Gómez as well, causing Gómez to throw punches at Snider, igniting a brief brawl in which Snider got hit in the eye by Gómez' teammate, Martin Maldonado. Gómez was suspended for three games. He initially appealed the suspension, but dropped it after suffering a minor back injury, using the time for the suspension to rest his back. Upon his return, Gómez was moved to the clean-up spot in the Brewers batting order, due to an injury to Aramis Ramírez. Gómez had another solid season in 2014, batting .284 with 23 home runs, 73 RBIs, 95 runs scored, and 34 stolen bases, though he was also caught stealing a career-high 12 times. He again led the National League in power-speed number (27.4). He was 2nd in the major leagues in hit by pitch, with 19.

Houston Astros

On July 30, 2015, the Brewers traded Gómez and Mike Fiers to the Houston Astros for Brett Phillips, Domingo Santana, Josh Hader, and Adrian Houser. On October 6, Gómez hit a solo home run in the AL Wild Card Game against the New York Yankees to put the Astros up 2–0 in the 4th inning, propelling them to a 3–0 win and a berth in the ALDS.

In 2016, Gómez batted .210 with five home runs in 85 games for the Astros. On August 10, Gómez was designated for assignment by the Astros. He was released on August 18.

Texas Rangers
Gómez signed a minor league contract with the Texas Rangers on August 20, 2016, and was assigned to the Round Rock Express of the PCL. He was promoted to the major leagues on August 25 and made his Rangers debut that night vs. the Cleveland Indians. Gómez homered in his first plate appearance with the club in a 9-0 win.  He hit a grand slam off of Félix Hernández of Seattle on August 31; having hit one against them earlier in the season while with the Astros, he became only the fourth player to hit two grand slams against the same opponent for two different teams (joining Ray Boone in 1953, Mike Piazza in 1998, and Ike Davis in 2014). Gómez finished the 2016 season with a batting average of .231 and 13 HR. Gómez rebounded with Texas after a dreadful 85 game stint with the Houston Astros. He finished with a .284 average and eight home runs in 33 games for Texas.

On December 13, 2016, Gómez re-signed with the Rangers on a one-year contract.

On April 29, 2017, in a game against the Los Angeles Angels, Gómez hit for the cycle for the second time in his career as the Rangers won 6-3.

Tampa Bay Rays

On March 3, 2018, Gómez signed a one-year contract with the Tampa Bay Rays. The contract was for $4 million with a provision for $500,000 in performances bonuses based on games played: $100,000 each for 80, 90, 100, 110 and 120. On April 22, Gomez hit his first career walk-off home run in an 8-6 win over one of Gomez's former teams, the Minnesota Twins.

In May 2018, Gomez said in multiple interviews that he did not believe MLB's drug testing was random and that he believed the league targets older players and Latin players. He claimed to have been tested six or seven times within the season's first two months. As translated by journalist Hector Gomez, Carlos Gomez said in Spanish: "Until they prove to me that it is random, I will not believe it. Because for me, it's not random...I have the greatest luck on my team, because they test me more than everyone else. I arrived now, three days after coming from the disabled list, and they are already testing me again."

Gomez ended the season hitting .208 (a career low)/.298/.336 with nine home runs in 118 games. He tied for the major league lead in being hit by a pitch, with 21.

Second stint with the Mets
On March 8, 2019, the Mets signed Gómez to a minor league contract with an invitation to spring training.

On May 18, the Mets called up Gómez. Against the Nationals, on May 23, Gómez hit a 3-run home run in the bottom of the 8th to lead the Mets to a 6-4 win, his first as a Met in 12 years.

Gómez was released on June 30, 2019. In 2019 he batted .198/.278/.337 with three home runs in 86 at bats.

In January 2020, Gómez announced his retirement from professional baseball.

On September 24, 2021, he was inducted into the Milwaukee Brewers Wall of Honor, signing papers to officially retire as a Brewer.

See also
 List of Major League Baseball players to hit for the cycle

References

External links

1985 births
Living people
Águilas Cibaeñas players
Binghamton Mets players
Corpus Christi Hooks players
Dominican Republic expatriate baseball players in the United States
Gold Glove Award winners
Gulf Coast Mets players
Hagerstown Suns players
Houston Astros players
Kingsport Mets players

Leones del Escogido players
Major League Baseball center fielders
Major League Baseball players from the Dominican Republic
Minnesota Twins players
Milwaukee Brewers players
Nashville Sounds players
National League All-Stars
New Orleans Zephyrs players
New York Mets players
Round Rock Express players
St. Lucie Mets players
Tampa Bay Rays players
Texas Rangers players
Wisconsin Timber Rattlers players
Syracuse Mets players